Manchester East  was one of six single-member parliamentary constituencies created in 1885 by the division of the existing three-member Parliamentary Borough of Manchester. The others were: Manchester South, Manchester North, Manchester North East, Manchester North West and Manchester South West.  They were all abolished in 1918.

Boundaries
The constituency was created by the Redistribution of Seats Act 1885, and was defined as consisting of the following areas:
The Parish of Bradford,
The Parish of Ardwick,
The Parish of Beswick,
The part of the Parish of Chorlton-upon-Medlock north of the centres of Cavendish Street, Grosvenor Street, Upper Brook Street, Dover Street, St. Leonards Street, and Cheltenham Street.

The next redistribution took place under the terms of the Representation of the People Act 1918. The Manchester East seat was divided between the two new constituencies of Manchester Ardwick and Manchester Clayton.

Members of Parliament

Election results 1885-1918

Elections in the 1880s

Balfour was appointed Secretary of State for Scotland, requiring a by-election.

Elections in the 1890s

Balfour was appointed First Lord of the Treasury, requiring a by-election.

Elections in the 1900s

Notable result as Arthur Balfour had led the Conservative Party into the 1906 general election as leader. He therefore became the first leader of the opposition to lose his seat.

Elections in the 1910s

General Election 1914–15:

Another General Election was required to take place before the end of 1915. The political parties had been making preparations for an election to take place and by July 1914, the following candidates had been selected; 
Labour: John Sutton
Unionist: Gerald Hurst

References

Sources 
Election Results:
https://web.archive.org/web/20060520143104/http://www.manchester.gov.uk/elections/archive/gen1900.htm
https://web.archive.org/web/20060520143047/http://www.manchester.gov.uk/elections/archive/gen1945.htm
Horridge:
List of Privy Counsellors (1936–1952)
http://politics.guardian.co.uk/electionspast/story/0,15867,1450577,00.html
https://web.archive.org/web/20060211081205/http://www.aoqc42.dsl.pipex.com/majauto/autogra01.shtml
Sutton:

East
Constituencies of the Parliament of the United Kingdom represented by a sitting Prime Minister
Constituencies of the Parliament of the United Kingdom established in 1885
Constituencies of the Parliament of the United Kingdom disestablished in 1918